The 2010 Arizona Wildcats softball team represented the University of Arizona in the 2010 NCAA Division I softball season.  The Wildcats were coached by Mike Candrea, who led his twenty-third season.  The Wildcats finished with a record of 52–14.  They competed in the Pacific-10 Conference, where they finished third with a 12–8 record.

The Wildcats were invited to the 2010 NCAA Division I softball tournament, where they swept the Regional and then completed a run to the title game of the Women's College World Series where they fell to champion UCLA.

Personnel

Roster

Coaches

Schedule

References

Arizona
Arizona Wildcats softball seasons
Arizona Softball
Women's College World Series seasons